The fourth season of Cold Case, an American television series, began airing on September 24, 2006 and concluded on May 6, 2007. Season four regular cast members include Kathryn Morris, Danny Pino, John Finn, Thom Barry, Jeremy Ratchford and Tracie Thoms. This is the only season of the series to feature 24 episodes.

During this season before the season finale "Stalker", Danny Pino guest starred as his character Scotty Valens in an episode of CSI: NY, also produced by Jerry Bruckheimer.

Cast

Episodes

References

2006 American television seasons
2007 American television seasons
Cold Case seasons